Paul R. Wharton High School (also known as Wharton High School) is a public high school in Tampa, Florida, United States. It was established in 1997 and is part of the Hillsborough County Public Schools district.

Athletics

Soccer 
In 2008, the boys' soccer team won the class 5A state championship.

Tennis 
The Wildcats boys tennis team won state championships in 2008, 2009, and 2010.

Notable alumni 
 Candice Dupree, WNBA player
 Larry Edwards, NFL player
 Adam Kluger, Business Magnate, Music Manager of Lil Yachty, Bhad Bhabie
 Ettore Ewen, professional wrestler
 Vernon Hargreaves, NFL player
 Chase Litton, NFL player
 Auden Tate, NFL player

References

External links 
 

High schools in Hillsborough County, Florida
Public high schools in Florida
Educational institutions established in 1997
1997 establishments in Florida